The Catholicate of the West was a Christian denomination established in 1944 and which ceased to exist in 1994 to become the British Orthodox Church.

The denomination was also known as the Catholic Apostolic Church, the Catholicate of the West (Catholic Apostolic Church), The United Orthodox Catholic Rite, The Celtic Catholic Church, the Patriarchate of Glastonbury, The Western Orthodox Catholic Church, and the Orthodox Church of the British Isles.

History

Background

Notice from Aprhem I 
On 1 December 1938, Ignatius Aprhem I of the Syriac Orthodox Patriarchate of Antioch and All the East, issued a notice in which it was stated among other things:

 "[T]o all whom it may concern that there are in the United States of America and in some countries of Europe, particularly in England, a number of schismatic bodies which have come into existence after direct expulsion from official Christian communities and have devised for themselves a common creed and a system of jurisdiction of their invention."
 "To deceive Christians of the West being a chief objective of the schismatic bodies, they take advantage of their great distance from the East, and from time to time make public statements claiming without truth to derive their origin and apostolic succession from some Apostolic Church of the East, the attractive rites and ceremonies of which they adopt and with which they claim to have relationship."
 "[W]e deny any and every relationship with these schismatic bodies [...]. Furthermore, our Church forbids any and every relationship and, above all, all intercommunion with all and any of these schismatic sects and warns the public that their statements and pretentions as above all altogether without truth."

The statement alarmed the head of the Ancient British Church, the Patriarch Herbert James Monzani Heard (religious name: Mar Jacobus II).

Council of London 
On 17 October 1943, a council later known as the Council of London took place, as Mar Jacobus II had decided to respond to this notice. The council was composed of major and minor prelates from the Ancient British Church, the British Orthodox Catholic Church, the Apostolic Episcopal Church, the Old Catholic Orthodox Church, the Order of Holy Wisdom, and the Order of Antioch. The council took place at 271 Green Lanes, Palmers Green, n. 13.; part of the building was rented as an office of the Patriarch of the Ancient British Church.

The summary of the decision of this council which was printed on a leaflet stated, among other things, the following:

 "The Council, embracing steadfastly the definitions of the Seven Ecumenical Councils and the Holy Apostolical Traditions repudiated the heresies of Monophysitism and Jansenism and all other heresies"
 "[I]n view of Ignatius Ephrem I having disclaimed all connection with the above-mentioned extensions of his patriarchate, lawfully made by his predecessor, the said Ignatius Ephrem was no longer recognized as holding office, that in consequence of the Patriarchal Synod and many of the bishops in Syria and Malabar having adhered to the aforementioned the right to elect to the vacant see was declared to be now vested in the Council"

The council also states that "in order to prevent confusion with the followers of the adherents of the aforesaid patriarch", the "rightful Patriarchate of Antioch should no longer be called 'the Syrian Orthodox' or 'Jacobite' Church, but should be hereafter known as 'The Ancient Orthodox Catholic Church' and by no other name". Also, "the original jurisdiction of the Patriarchate should remain as heretofore, but its extensions in the West were specifically recognized and confirmed in their rights".

Furthermore, "the traditional name 'Ignatius' in the official designation of the Patriarch should be abandoned, and the name 'Basilius' substituted therefor; [...] the full Patriarchal title should in future be as follows: 'His Holiness Mohoran Mar Basilius N., Sovereign Prince Patriarch of the God-protected city of Antioch and of all the Domain of the Apostolic Throne, both in the East and in the West.

The council elected as Patriarch of Antioch, William Bernard Crow, founder of the esoteric Order of Holy Wisdom and previously ordained a bishop in 1943 by Mar Jacobus II under the name Mar Bernard; after this election, Crow took the religious name Patriarch Basilius Abdullah III. The council stated that "all bishops dependant upon the See of Antioch were required to make their canonical submission" to Abdullah III "within six months from the date of the Council, unless lawfully hindered".

All those churches present at the council claimed to be an extension of the Syriac Orthodox Patriarchate of Antioch; this claim rested upon Jules Ferrette's claim. According to Anson:

No bishop from the East made any submission to Abdullah III.

Creation of the Catholicate 
By a declaration dated 23 March 1944, the Ancient British Church, the British Orthodox Catholic Church, and the Old Catholic Orthodox Church merged into a new body; the official name of this new body was: The Western Orthodox Catholic Church. This body was soon after its creation renamed to Catholicate of the West by Patriarch Abdullah III. No church of the East gave its recognition to the Catholicate of the West.

The first Catholicos of the West, head of the Catholicate of the West, was Hugh George de Willmott Newman, also called Mar Georgius. He was consacred as this status by Abdullah III on 10 April 1944 under the name and title: Mar Georgius, Archbishop and Metropolitan of the Holy Metropolis of Glastonbury, the Occidental Jerusalem, and Catholicos of the West. Thereafter, Mar Jacobus II stepped down from his office of fifth Patriarch of the Ancient British Church, passing his rank of Patriarch to Willmott Newman; thus Willmott Newman was both Catholicos of the West and the sixth Patriarch of the Ancient British Church. Mar Jacobus II died in 1947.

On 14 July 1945, Patriarch Abdullah III and Newman mutually agreed that the Catholicate of the West and its head would be completely independent, that the Catholicate would not be under the jurisdiction of Abdullah III and would only be under the jurisdiction of the Catholicos of the West.

Subdivision 
The Catholicate of the West had been divided into 8 dioceses by March 1947:

 Patriarchal Archdiocese of Glastonbury (counties of Somerset, Wilts, Dorset, Hants, Surrey, London, Middlesex), headed by Newman (Mar Georgius) with his assistants (Mar Joannes, titular bishop of St Marylebone, and Mar Benignus, titular bishop of Mere)
 Diocese of Selsey (Sussex), headed by Mar Jacobus II
 Diocese of Siluria (Principality of Wales and county of Monmouth), headed by Mar Hedley
 Diocese of Mercia (Berks and Oxon), headed by Mar Theodorus
 Diocese of Repton (counties of Derby, Stafford, Cheshire, Lancashire), headed by Mar David
 Diocese of Minster (Kent and Essex), headed by Mar Francis
 Diocese of Deira (County of York), headed by Mar Adrianus
 Diocese of Verulam (Hertfordshire), headed by Mar John

"All the rest of the British Isles remained under the personal jurisdiction of Mar Georgius, pending the erection of more dioceses."

By a bull dated 27 July 1947, Newman "erected a small group of ex-Latin Catholics in Belgium" into a rite "under his own jurisdiction. This new body was given the name of L'Église Catholique du Rite Dominicain".

The Catholicate had also been divided, by the 12 November 1947 or by 1948, into 12 eparchies (later called "apostolikes") representing the 12 tribes of the spiritual Israel. Those eparchies were "constituted on a general basis of the origins, races, and languages of Europe and Asia Minor in the days of the Undivided Church. Territories since discovered were regarded as 'suburbs' of the nations mainly responsible for their development." Those eparchies were each to be led by an Apostolic Primate; only three of the 12 eparchies had an Apostolic Primate. The 12 eparchies were the eparchies:

 of all Britons (British Isles and British overseas possessions outside of America), headed by the Patriarchate of Glastonbury
 of all the Iberians (Spain, Portugal, Portuguese overseas possessions, Andorra and the Americas), headed by the Patriarchate of Malaga
 of all the Frisians (Netherlands and Indonesia), headed by the Patriarchate of Amersfoort
 of all the Helvetians (Switzerland and the Principality of Lichtenchtein)
 of all the Latins (Italy, Italian overseas possessions, Vatican City, San Marino)
 of all the Franks (France, French overseas possessions, Belgium and its overseas possessions, and the Principality of Monaco)
 of all the Teutons (Germany, and the Free City of Danzig)
 of all the Pannonians (Austria and Czechoslovakia)
 of all the Slavs (Russia, Poland, and the Baltic States)
 of all the Turanians (Hungary, Finland, and Turkey)
 of all the Scandinavians (Denmark, Norway, Sweden, Iceland, and Greenland)
 of all the Levantines (Greece, Albania, the Balkan States, Asia Minor, and Egypt)

Five Church Courts of the Catholicate were set up near Kew Gardens: the Diocesan Tribunal, the Provincial Tribunal, the Exarchal Tribunal, the Patriarchal Tribunal, and the Supreme Ecclesiastical Tribunal.

Glastonbury rite and confession 
By 1948, the Glastonbury rite was created for the Catholicate of the West. The Glastonbury rite was compiled by Newman in 8 volumes of liturgical books. The rite was mainly based on the Irvingite book The Liturgy and other Divine Offices of the Church with interpolated extracts from other liturgies. The goal of Newman in making this rite was to make the world's richest, most fastuous rite. The Glastonbury rite (also called "liturgy of saint Joseph of Arimathea") is a neo-Gallican rite which was an attempt to make a Western Orthodox rite.

On 1 June 1952, Newman published a book titled The Glastonbury confession, a profession of faith which was binding for all clergy of the Catholicate. Anson states there were "few bishops and clergy" left at the time.

Loss of churches 
Between 1951 and 1953 included, the following churches under the jurisdiction of the Catholicate left it: the Orthodox Catholic Church in England (cast out of the Catholicate in August 1951), the Ancient Catholic Church, and the Indian Orthodox Church.

Dissolution and continuation 
In 1953, Newman held a synod at Glastonbury; the synod decided to dissolve the Catholicate of the West. The dissolution was done in order for the Indian law to accept the dissolution of the Indian Orthodox Church that had been under the Catholicos from 1950 until 1951–1953. To replace the Catholicate of the West, an organisation was created called the United Orthodox Catholicate, still headed by Newman. By the time the synod of dissolution was held, the Catholicate "had shrunk to three Provinces: (1) Britain, (2) Belgium, Holland, and Luxembourg, (3) Germany, and a French Mission". An organisation headed by Newman called the United Orthodox Catholic Rite  took the title of Catholicate of the West from 1959 and onward. Those "puzzling manoeuvres" were made to put an end to the system of "autocephalous tropoi" of the Catholicate, something which "could be done legally only by dissolving the corporation and starting de novo".

By 1959, the Catholicate of the West only had only six bishops left, and the Catholicate's twelve eparchies, Anson notes, were "little more than half-forgotten memories". In 1960, Bishop Boltwood left the Catholicate of the West.

By 1964, the Catholicate had never applied to become part of the World Council of Churches, nor was it ever invited to join it.

At one point, under Newman, the Catholicate of the West became known as the Orthodox Church of the British Isles.

Death of Newman, end of the Catholicate 

In 1979, "Hugh George de Willmott Newman (1905-1979), [...] patriarch of Glastonbury [...], commonly known as Mar Georgius" died. He was succeeded as the patriarch of Glastonbury by William Henry Hugo Newman-Norton (Mar Seraphim) from 1979 to 1994.

In 1994, the Orthodox Church of the British Isles (formerly named Catholicate of the West), led by William Henry Hugo Newman-Norton, joined the Coptic Orthodox Church; Newman-Norton was consecrated as bishop of the Coptic Orthodox Church. Thus, in 1994, the Patriarchate of Glastonbury of Willmot Newman's succession ceased to exist. Some clergy members of the Orthodox Church of the British Isles refused to join the Coptic Church and therefore left the Orthodox Church of the British Isles. The Orthodox Church of the British Isles thus became the British Orthodox Church by joining the Coptic Church.

Claim of succession 
In 1976, another continuation had appeared when "Mar David, erstwhile Apostolic Primate of the Iberians in the Catholicate of the West," claimed that "the purported dissolution had neither been lawful nor effective and that the Catholicate of the West had continued to exist independently of Mar Georgius." "In 1977, the then-Patriarch of Malaga, Mar David I," merged his Catholicate of the West with the Apostolic Episcopal Church, of which he was also primate. Since then, "[t]he Prince-Abbot of San Luigi succeeded to the primacy of the Catholicate of the West and the Apostolic Episcopal Church in 2015". The current claimant to this alleged succession is John Kersey (Edmond III), also claimant successor to the Order of Corporate Reunion and dispenser of the Vilatte orders.

Doctrine 
The Catholicate of the West considered itself to be one of the churches along with all churches with a valid apostolic succession to compose the one, holy, catholic, and apostolic Church.

On 17 January 1947, the Holy Governing Synod of the Catholicate issued a decree which stated it rejected the Filioque and had removed it from the Nicene Creed of the Catholicate.

In 1955, the Catholicate adopted its Chapter and Organic Constitution. The Chapters article VI stated: "This Rite [the Catholicate of the West] is not autogenic, but is [...] the direct spiritual heir of the Ancient Celtic Church, established at Glastonbury in A.D. 37, immediately after the Passion of Christ by Joseph of Arimathea, and afterwards extended into the Celtic and other lands of the Western Christendom, and restored in 1866 upon the authority of the Syrian-Orthodox Patriarchate of Antioch; and in the East represents the remnant of the Syro-Chaldean Christians of St Thomas, derived from the preaching of the blessed Apostle St Thomas in the first century, and reorganised in 1862 upon the authority of the Syro-Chaldean Patriarchal See of Seleucia-Ctesiphon. This Rite is also the Repository of the mission conferred upon the late Archbishop Arnold Harris Matthew in 1908 by the Old Catholic Archiepiscopal See of Utrecht. By virtue of its threefold continuity and mission aforesaid, this Rite is not a sect or a schism, but a lawful and canonical Rite within the Church Universal."

In 1961, an official publication of the Catholicate, Maranatha (see Maranatha), stated the Catholicate "has no connections whatsoever with Old Roman Catholicism, Anglicanism, or with any psychic cult, in any shape of form, but it is in all respects Catholic, Apostolic, and Orthodox, having valid Orders, Mission and Jurisdiction as an Autocephalous Rite within THE ONE HOLY CATHOLIC AND APOSTOLIC CHURCH".

See also 
 Celtic Orthodox Church
Catholic Christian Church
Independent sacramental movement

Notes

References

Further reading 

 Seraphim Newman-Norton, Fitly Framed Together: A Summary of the History, Beliefs and Mission of the Orthodox Church of the British Isles, Glastonbury: Metropolitical Press, 1976

Christian denominations
20th-century Christianity
Western Rite Orthodoxy
Religious organizations established in 1944
Religious organisations disestablished in 1994
Christian denominations established in the 20th century